Jo Good is a British broadcaster.

Career
A radio 'anorak' since her early teens, Jo joined the radio industry straight out of school, aged 17. At this point she moved from Alnwick, Northumberland to Manchester. Working first as a travel reporter, then a broadcast journalist, she started presenting solo shows at 20. She worked in the media industry for a decade before joining BBC 6 Music. Among her previous work includes being a presenter on the music channel MTV, where she hosted The Dancefloor Chart. She has also presented the afternoon show on XFM. In summer 2012 she completed a degree in English literature at the University of Salford.

She left Radio X in 2017.

Personal life
Jo Good lives in Manchester, with her partner and two rescue dogs.

External links
 Jo Good on Radio X

References

1978 births
Living people
Kuwaiti expatriates in the United Kingdom
Alumni of the University of Salford
English radio DJs
English radio personalities
Mass media people from Manchester